The 2007 World Men's Handball Championship took place from 19 January to 4 February 2007 in Germany. 24 national teams played in 12 German cities. It was the 20th edition of the World Championship in team handball and was won by the hosts.

Stadiums
12 German cities were hosts for the 2007 Championship. The most modern stadiums – spread all over the country – had been selected. The final match took place in the Kölnarena in Cologne (Köln).

Venues

Qualification

Tournament structure

Preliminary round

The 24 competing teams will be drawn into six preliminary groups of four teams each, and the matches in the preliminary round are scheduled to be held from 20 to 22 January. The two top teams from each group then proceed to the main round, while the third and fourth-placed teams play in the Presidents-Cup.

On 14 July 2006, the groups of the tournament were determined:

Presidents-Cup

The teams placed third and fourth in the preliminary round groups are divided into four groups of three teams, as such:

The matches are scheduled for 24 to 26 January. On 28 January, the winners of group I and II then play each other for the 13th place, the runners-up play each other for the 15th place, and the third-placed play off for 17th place. The Group III and IV teams play off for 19th, 21st and 23rd place in the same fashion.

Main round

The main round is scheduled for 24 to 28 January, and the teams will be divided into two groups of six teams. The teams carry forward match results from matches against the other team from their group to qualify for the main round. Four teams from each main round group qualify for the quarter-finals.

No placement matches for the places 9 to 12 are scheduled.

Knockout stage

The knockout stage is scheduled to make up the last week of the tournament, starting on Tuesday 30 January and continuing until Sunday 4 February. The quarter-finals are set up so that the winner of one group will face the fourth-placed team in the other. Semi-finals and consolation matches are held on 1 February; two days later, the 5th and 7th place play-offs take place on 3 February, with the 3rd place play-off and final is scheduled for the following day.

Seedings

The seedings for the preliminary round have been partially determined; the full seedings will be revealed when all qualifying matches have been played. Currently, the following seedings (in IHF terminology, performance row) have been confirmed:

 Pot 1: Spain, France, Denmark, Tunisia, Croatia, Germany
 Pot 2: Europe 4, Europe 5, Europe 6, Europe 7, Europe 8, Europe 9
 Pot 3: Egypt, Kuwait, Morocco, Europe 10, Europe 11, Brazil
 Pot 4: Angola, South Korea, Qatar, Argentina, Greenland, Australia

Preliminary round
All times are local (UTC+1).

Group A

Group B

Group C

Group D

Group E

Group F

President's Cup

Group I

Group II

Group III

Group IV

23rd place game

21st place game

19th place game

17th place game

15th place game

13th place game

Main round

Group I

Group II

Knockout stage

Bracket
Championship bracket

5th place bracket

Quarterfinals

5–8th place semifinals

Semifinals

Eleventh place game

Ninth place game

Seventh place game

Fifth place game

Third place game

Final

Ranking and statistics

Final ranking

All Star Team
Goalkeeper: 
Left wing: 
Left back: 
Pivot: 
Centre back: 
Right back: 
Right wing:

Other awards
Most Valuable Player:

Top goalscorers

Source: IHF

Top goalkeepers

Source: IHF

Medalists

External links
official website 
National Handball Teams

Notes and references

World Handball Championship tournaments
World Championship Men
H
W
January 2007 sports events in Europe
February 2007 sports events in Europe